The pale rosefinch (Carpodacus stoliczkae) is a species of finch in the family Fringillidae. It is found in Afghanistan and China. It was formerly considered conspecific with the Sinai rosefinch. Its natural habitat is hot deserts.

References

pale rosefinch
Birds of Afghanistan
Birds of Western China
pale rosefinch